Samuel Standidge Boden (born 4 May 1826 in East Retford, Nottinghamshire; d. 13 January 1882 in Bedford Square, London) was an English professional chess master.

The mating pattern "Boden's Mate" was named after the mate that occurred in one of his games, Schulder–Boden, London 1853.

There is also a line in the Philidor Defence named after him, based on one of his games against Paul Morphy. Morphy was of the opinion that Boden was the strongest English master, even though Barnes had a better record against him than Boden.

He was the author of A Popular Introduction to the Study and Practice of Chess, published anonymously in 1851.

References

External links

 Remembering Samuel Boden from British Chess News
 [fr] Boden gambit by Dany Sénéchaud on Mieux jouer aux échecs

1826 births
1882 deaths
British chess players
19th-century chess players